Didelphodon (from [is] "opossum" plus   "tooth") is a genus of stagodont metatherians from the Late Cretaceous of North America.

Description

The teeth have specialized bladelike cusps and carnassial notches, indicating that the animal was a predator; the jaws are short and massive and bear enormous, bulbous premolar teeth which appear to have been used for crushing. Analyses of a near-complete skull referred to Didelphodon show that it had an unusually high bite force quotient (i.e. bite force relative to body size) among Mesozoic mammals, suggesting a durophagous diet. However, its skull lacks the vaulted forehead of hyenas and other specialized bone-eating durophagous mammals, indicating that its diet was perhaps a mixture of hard foodstuffs (e.g. snails, bones) alongside small vertebrates and carrion; although omnivorous habits were suggested in the past, it appears that it was incapable of processing plant matter, rendering it more likely to be hypercarnivorous or durophagous. Some convergence with the carnassials of other predatory mammal groups has also been noted.

Discovery
Three species of Didelphodon are known: D. vorax, D. padanicus, and D. coyi. The genus is known from the Hell Creek Formation of Montana and the Lance Formation of Wyoming, the Frenchman Formation of Saskatchewan, the Horseshoe Canyon Formation of Alberta, and the Scollard Formation of Alberta, where it is one of the most abundant mammals. It is found solely in late Maastrichtian deposits.

Classification
Didelphodon is a stagodontid marsupial related to Eodelphis and Pariadens. The genus appears to descend from the Campanian Eodelphis, and in particular appears to be related to Eodelphis cutleri. Pariadens appears to be more primitive than either Eodelphis or Didelphodon, and is probably sister to their group. Didelphimorphia is an order that was named in 1872 by Gill. Previously, in 1821, Gray named the superfamily Didelphoidea to house the families Alphadontidae, Pediomyidae, Peradectidae, and Stagodontidae, which unites Didelphodon with many other genera.In 2006, a study found that the stagodontids only contained two taxa, Didelphodon and Eodelphis. The previously-included Pariadens was excluded from the group because its type species, P. kirklandi, lacks any of the clade's characteristics; it was reassigned to Marsupialia incertae sedis. Another species, "P." mckennai lacks marsupial features, and is probably a therian. Another historical stagodontid, Boreodon, is a nomen dubium. Finally, the purported stagodontid Delphodon is probably a synonym of Pediomys or Alphadon.

A 2016 phylogenetic analysis found that Didelphodon and other stagodontids were marsupialiforms. Their relationships within the Marsupialiformes are shown below.

Paleobiology

Although it has been argued on the basis of the shape of referred tarsal bones that Didelphodon and other stagodontids were semiaquatic due to having flexible feet, these traits may in fact be evidence of increased rigidity in the foot. A study that is being prepared by Kraig Derstler, Greg Wilson, Robert Bakker, Ray Vodden and Mike Triebold will describe this new specimen, housed in the Rocky Mountain Dinosaur Resource Center. A study on Mesozoic mammal locomotion demonstrates that Didelphodon groups with semi-aquatic species.

The evolution of Didelphodon and other large stagodontids (as well as large deltatheroideans like Nanocuris) occurs after the local extinction of eutriconodont mammals, suggesting passive or direct ecological replacement. Given that all insectivorous and carnivorous mammal groups suffered heavy losses during the mid-Cretaceous, it seems likely these metatherians simply occupied niches left after the extinction of eutriconodonts.

See also
 Largest prehistoric animals

References

Further reading 
 
 Clemens, W. A., Jr. (1979). Marsupialia. Mesozoic mammals: the first two-thirds of mammalian history. J. A. Lilligraven, Kielan-Jaworowska and W. A. Clemens, Jr. Berkeley, University of California Press: 192–220.
 Fox, R. C., & Naylor, B. G. (1986). A new species of Didelphodon Marsh (Marsupialia) from the Upper Cretaceous of Alberta, Canada: paleobiology and phylogeny. Neues Jahrbuch für Geologie und Paläontologie, Abhandlungen, 172, 357–380.
 BBC Online: Science & Nature: Prehistoric Life

Prehistoric metatherians
Late Cretaceous mammals of North America
Lance fauna
Hell Creek fauna
Fossil taxa described in 1889
Taxa named by Othniel Charles Marsh
Prehistoric mammal genera